The Walhalla railway line was a  narrow gauge railway located in Gippsland, Victoria, Australia. The line ran from Moe to the former gold-mining town and popular tourist destination of Walhalla. Construction began in 1904. The line closed in sections from 1944 to 1954.

History 

The last of four narrow gauge lines of the Victorian Railways, construction of the Moe–Walhalla railway began in 1904, but was not completed until 1910 due to the difficult mountainous terrain to be contended with.  The railway was expected to be a boon for the town, which was in a state of economic and population decline due to gold mining operations becoming increasingly uneconomical, the largest gold mining company closing in 1914.  But the arrival of the railway did not save the town.

After the closure of the Walhalla mines, substantial timber traffic was carried from sawmills in the Erica area until the late 1940s. Although the line carried numerous special passenger trains to Walhalla in the 1930s and early 1940s, freight and passenger traffic to Walhalla itself declined to almost nothing by 1939. The railway was closed in sections from 1944 to 1954, the section from Platina to Walhalla closing in April 1944 and the final section from Moe to Erica eventually closing on 25 June 1954. The tracks and buildings were removed by 1960, leaving only the roadbed and a number of bridges.

The Thomson River Railway Bridge is listed on the Register of the National Estate.  The centre span was part of a road bridge over the Murray River at Tocumwal (NSW).

The station building at Walhalla was relocated to the Melbourne suburban station of Hartwell.

Reconstruction 

In recognition of the outstanding tourist potential of the railway, a number of attempts were made to reopen the line for tourist traffic, but none were successful until the early 1990s. The Walhalla Railway Taskforce was formed in 1991, becoming the Walhalla Goldfields Railway, Inc., in 1993. By this time the roadbed was a totally overgrown jungle of blackberries and heavy scrub, with numerous sections of the trackbed having collapsed and all being derelict except one of the bridges. Restoration began with the establishment of Thomson Station and its accompanying yard on the site of an original station. The railway commenced operations in April 1994, within the Thomson Station yard. Gradually the line extended, first over the nationally heritage-classified Thomson River Bridge in October 1994, pushing up the Stringers Creek Gorge to Happy Creek. This became the terminus for the line until the six bridges in the last kilometre into the Walhalla Station yard were completed, this section of line opening on 15 March 2002.

See also 
Narrow gauge lines of the Victorian Railways
Walhalla Goldfields Railway
List of closed regional railway stations in Victoria
List of closed regional railway lines in Victoria
Transportation in Australia
Tyers Valley Tramway

References

External links 
 Walhalla Goldfields Railway (official site)

Closed regional railway lines in Victoria (Australia)
2 ft 6 in gauge railways in Australia
Railway lines opened in 1910
Transport in Gippsland (region)
Shire of Baw Baw
Walhalla railway line